Irongate is a rural locality in the Toowoomba Region, Queensland, Australia.

Geography
Irongate Conservation Park is a  protected area off Wallingford Road in the south of the locality.

The land use is a mixture of crop growing and grazing on native vegetation.

History 
Iron Gate State School (also written as Irongate State School) opened on 17 January 1910 and closed on 10 February 1963. It was at 941 Irongate Road (junction with Mondam Road).

Wallingford State School opened on 7 April 1919 and closed on 27 August 1967. It was at 147 Wallingford Road.

Economy 
There are a number of homesteads in the locality, including:

 Bonnie Doon
 Chandon Lodge
 Cooleigh
 Craigilee
 Creston
 Farview
 Karinya
 North View
 Plain View
 Taronga
 Westernview
 Willow Glen
 Wondavue

Education 
There are no schools in Irongate. The nearest government primary schools are Mount Tyson State School in neighbouring Mount Tyson to the north-east, Pittsworth State School in Pittsworth to the south-east, and Brookstead State School in Brookstead to the south-west. The nearest government secondary school is Pittsworth State High School in Pittsworth.

References 

Toowoomba Region
Localities in Queensland